This is a list of the main career statistics of Indian professional  tennis player Sania Mirza.

Performance timelines

Singles

Doubles

Mixed doubles

Significant finals

Grand Slam finals

Women's doubles: 4 (3 titles, 1 runner-up)

Mixed doubles: 8 (3 titles, 5 runner-ups)

Olympic finals

Mixed doubles: 0

Year-end championships finals

Doubles: 2 (2 titles)

Premier Mandatory & Premier 5 finals

Doubles: 18 (9 titles, 9 runner-ups)

WTA career finals

Singles: 4 (1 title, 3 runner-ups)

Doubles: 66 (43 titles, 23 runner-ups)

ITF Circuit finals

Singles: 19 (14–5)

Doubles: 13 (4–9)

ITF Junior career

Junior Grand Slam finals

Girls' doubles: 1 (1 title)

Singles (10-4)

Doubles (13-6)

Fed Cup

Other finals

Singles

Doubles

Mixed doubles

Grand Slam seedings
The tournaments won by Sania are in boldface, and advanced into finals by Sania are in italics.

Women's doubles

*

Mixed doubles

Career earnings

Year-end rankings

SanTina Streaks

14-match win streak 2015 
Sania Mirza and Martina Hingis joined forces during March 2015. They saw immediate success winning first three tournaments together.

41-match win streak 2015–2016 
Sania Mirza and Martina Hingis were chasing the longest winning streak since 1990 at 44 match wins set by Jana Novotná and Helena Suková but fell 3 matches short.

Doubles Head to Head

Partnerships 

Sania Mirza had changed lot of partnerships before stopping singles play but once becoming a doubles specialist she became cautious and kept long partnerships in both Women's and Mixed doubles. Martina Hingis is the 70th women's doubles partner of Sania's career. Sania has also teamed with 14 players in Grandslam Mixed Doubles. She's currently playing Mixed Doubles with Ivan Dodig of Croatia.

Partners in Women's doubles

Records with Title Partners in Women's doubles

Partners in Mixed doubles 

 These lists only consists of players who played with Sania Mirza in WTA(& ITF) recognized tournaments which include the Olympics, Grand Slams, WTA Year-end championship,  Premier tournaments, Fed Cup Ties, and WTA Challengers. They do not include the players who played with her in the other unrecognised multi-sport events and leagues such as IPTL. ITF Junior partners are also not included. The order of the players in the list is based on their first partnering with Sania Mirza. Leander Paes had also earlier played with Sania Mirza in 2006, 2010 in Asian Games and Commonwealth Games.
 Sania has won one or more title(s) with players whose names are in bold and the current partners names are in italic.

Other partners

India – Asian Games/Commonwealth Games/Other events 
  Mahesh Bhupathi
  Leander Paes
  Vishnu Vardhan
  Shikha Uberoi
  Rushmi Chakravarthi
  Prarthana Thombare
  Saketh Myneni

International Premier Tennis League 
  Rohan Bopanna
  Roger Federer
  Ivan Dodig

Exhibition match
  Kim Clijsters

References
 http://www.itftennis.com/procircuit/players/player/profile.aspx?playerid=35014435

Tennis in India
Mirza, Sania